Holmstedt is a surname. Notable people with the surname include:

Anna Sophia Holmstedt (1759–1807), Swedish ballet dancer and translator
Janna Holmstedt (born 1972), Swedish artist
Kirsten Holmstedt, American writer and journalist
Ragnar Holmstedt, Swedish footballer